The 2021–22 Sheikh Jamal DC's season was the 11th competitive season in top-class football since club established in 2010. The season were covered from 1 October 2021 to 30 July 2022.

Season overview

November
On 27 November 2021 the club played first match of the season against Bangladesh Air Force and got victory by 3–0. Scorers of the match Otabek Valijonov, Solomon King Kanform and Sohanur Rahman.

December
On 1 December Sheikh Jamal DC has played second match of their group and ended the match goalless.

On 5 December Sheikh Jamal DC have played against Sheikh Russel KC last match of their group B of 2021–22 Independence Cup (Bangladesh) and draw 1–1 goals. On 26 minutes Jamal defender Sahin Mia goal took lead but after two minutes Sheikh Russel KC Guinean forward Esmaël Gonçalves
goal scored level. After second half both teams footballers doesn't found the net.

On 12 December Sheikh Jamal DC defeated to Bashundhara Kings by 0–4. In the first half were played scoreless second half 58 minutes Motin Mia Bashundhara Kings took lead and two goals scored by Brazilian star  Jonathan Fernandez 73 & 81 & last on 90+4 minutes by Alamgir Kabir Rana made its 4–0. Sheikh Jamal DC eliminated from the tournament.

On 26 December Sheikh Jamal DC 3-0 goals against Muktijoddha Sangsad KC by FIFA Walkover laws. The match scheduled to play but opposition team withdrew their name from the tournament and Jamal awarded winner with 3 point.

On 30 December Sheikh Jamal DC draw 1–1 against Rahmatganj MFS. On 7 minutes Nurul Absar goal took lead Sheikh Jamal DC and they have finished first half with lead. In the second half additional time 90+1 minutes goal by Sajidur Rahman Sajid equal the scored. Due to Muktijoddha Sangsad KC withdrawn both teams points were equal in the group stage and referee were used penalty shoot out to the determined group champion which Sheikh Jamal DC won 5–0 goals.

January
On 3 January Sheikh Jamal DC lost 6–0 goals against Dhaka Abahani. In the first half on 22 minutes goal by Dorielton and 35 Raphael Augusto took lead Abahani and go to half time break. In the second half on 62 Dorielton made it 3–0. In the 70 minutes Daniel Colindres found the net. Nabib Newaj Jibon on 81 and 90+1 minutes double Dhaka Abahai thrashed Sheikh Jamal DC 6–0. Sheikh Jamal DC eliminated from the tournament with huge lost.

February
On 3 February Sheikh Jamal DC played their home match against Uttar Baridhara Club an won by 2–1 goals. On 12 minutes Gambian forward Sulayman Sillah and Nigerian forward Matthew Chinedu goals on 45 minutes took the lead before half time. Uttar Baridhara Uzbekistan Midfielder 	Evgeniy Kochnev penalty goal on 68 minutes ended the match 2–1.

On 8 February Sheikh Jamal DC won away match by 3–0 against Muktijoddha Sangsad KC. In the first half on 20 minutes a goal by Solomon King Kanform made score 1–0 and on 35 minutes a goal by Matthew Chinedu made score 2–0 before finished half time break. In the second half  on 57 minutes a goals by Matthew Chinedu scoreline made 3–0. Muktijoddha Sangsad KC players would able to score any goal against Sheikh Jamal DC until ended the game. Sheikh Jamal DC graved the victory with 3–0.

On 12 February Sheikh Jamal DC has meet against Bangladesh Police FC in the home match and finished it goalless 0–0. In the first half both team play excellent and ended it goalless. In the second half both teams started playing attacking football to take lead but they won't found any goals. On 81 minutes Uzbekistan Otabek Valizhazov showed red card due to bad fouls. Last 19 minutes Sheikh Jamal DC played with 10 men's squad but Police FC couldn't able to score any goal.

On 17 February Sheikh Jamal DC drew 3–3 against Rahmatganj MFS in away match. In the first half on 23 minutes Gambian forward Solomon King Kanform goal took lead and his second goals on 43 minutes finished halftime with lead 2–0. In the second half on 68 minutes Tajikistan forward Siyovush Asrorov goal made scoreline 2–1. Afternoon 6 minutes a goal by Mohammed Atikuzzaman lead the score 3–1 but the lead was retained till 89 minutes before score Sunday Chizoba on 90 minutes and Lancine Touré on 90+4 minutes. End the match with result 3–3 goals.

On 23 February Sheikh Jamal DC defeated 1–0 goal Sheikh Russel KC at home ground. In the first half on 33 minutes Nigerian forward Matthew Chinedu goal took lead and finished halftime with 1–0 lead. In the second half both teama play goalless and Sheikh Jamal DC secured win with 3 points.

March
On 6 March Sheikh Jamal DC defeated by 2–1 goals Chittagong Abahani at home ground.

On 11 March Sheikh Jamal DC have drew 2–2 goals against Saif Sporting Club in the away game.

April
On 3 April Sheikh Jamal DC won against Swadhinata KS by 3–1 goals at in the away game. In the first half on 29 and 38 minutes Nigerian Matthew Chinedu goal Sheikh Jamal DC took lead and finished first half 0–2. In the second half on 53 minutes Nedo Turković goal made score 1–2. But Swadhinata KS couldn't able to avoid their defeat Matthew Chinedu hat trick goals on 67 minutes secured huge victory for Sheikh Jamal DC.

On 24 April Sheikh Jamal DC have defeated Uttar Baridhara Club by 2–0 goals at in the away game. In the first half on 2 minutes new signed Nigerian forward Chijoke Alaekwe give lead for Sheikh Jamal DC and on 21 minutes Nigerian another forward Musa Najare score on 21 minutes and they have finished half time. In the second half both teams plyed excellent and defensive football and end of time Sheikh Jamal DC score  remains 2–0 goals.

On 29 April Sheikh Jamal DC won by 2–1 against Muktijoddha Sangsad KC at home ground. In the first half on 28 minutes Nigerian forward Musa Najare opened account for Sheikh Jamal DC and they have got clean lead in the first half. In the second half on 66 minutes Sheikh Jamal DC Gambian forward Solmon King Kanform goals made scoreless 2–0 but after 4 minutes on 70 Muktijoddha Sangsad KC Guinean Defender Abubocar Baki Camara reduced score to 2–1. End of 90+ minutes Sheikh Jamal DC left the ground with full three points.

May
On 7 May Sheikh Jamal DC defeated to Bangladesh Police FC by 0–1 goal at away game.

On 12 May Sheikh Jamal DC have won by 1–0 goal in the home game against Rahmatganj MFS.

June
On 21 June Sheikh Jamal DC have lost to Sheikh Russel KC by 1–3 goals in the away game.
 
On 27 June Sheikh Jamal DC defeated against Dhaka Mohammedan by 1–3 goals in the away game.

July
On 3 July Sheikh Jamal DC got victory versus Chittagong Abahani by 2–0 goals in the away game.

On 8 July Sheikh Jamal DC have drawn against Saif Sporting Club by 2–2 goals at home venue.

On 19 July Sheikh Jamal DC have lost against Dhaka Abahani by 0–5 goals in the away game.

On 26 July Sheikh Jamal DC have drew against Swadhinata KS by 2–2 goals at home ground.

On 30 July Sheikh Jamal DC have lost to Bashundhara Kings by 1–2 goals at home stadium.

Current squad
Lt. Sheikh Jamal Dhanmondi Club Limited Squad for 2021–22 season.

Pre-season friendly

Transfer

In

Out

Released

Competitions

Overall

Overview

Independence Cup

Group stages

Group B

Knockout stage

Federation Cup

Group stages

Group D

Knockout stage

Premier League

League table

Results summary

Results by round

Matches

Statistics

Goalscorers

Source: Matches

References

2022 in Bangladeshi football
Football clubs in Bangladesh
2010 establishments in Bangladesh
Bangladeshi football club records and statistics
Sport in Dhaka